Pir Zulfiqar (born 3 January 1984) is a Pakistani first-class cricketer who played for Hyderabad cricket team.

References

External links
 

1984 births
Living people
Pakistani cricketers
Hyderabad (Pakistan) cricketers
People from Dadu District